The 1998 Quebec general election was held on November 30, 1998, to elect members of the National Assembly of the Province of Quebec, Canada. The incumbent Parti Québécois, led by Premier Lucien Bouchard, won re-election, defeating the Quebec Liberal Party, led by Jean Charest.

After the narrow defeat of the PQ's proposal for political independence for Quebec in an economic union with the rest of Canada in the 1995 Quebec referendum, PQ leader Jacques Parizeau resigned. In January 1996, Bouchard left federal politics, where he was leader of the Bloc Québécois in the House of Commons of Canada, to lead the Parti Québécois and become premier.

Jean Charest had also left federal politics, where he had been leader of the Progressive Conservative Party of Canada. Charest was initially seen as a bad fit for the Quebec Liberal Party, and for provincial politics. He later overcame this perception.

In terms of the number of seats won by each of the two parties, the result was almost identical to the previous 1994 general election.  However, this time the Liberals won a slightly larger percentage of the popular vote, but nonetheless far fewer seats.

Mario Dumont, leader of the Action démocratique du Québec, repeated his success in winning his own seat, as he had done in the 1994 general election. However, his party also repeated its failure to elect any other member apart from its leader.

Results
The overall results were:

Note:

* Party did not nominate candidates in the previous election.

See also
 List of Quebec political parties
 List of Quebec premiers
 Politics of Quebec
 Timeline of Quebec history
 36th National Assembly of Quebec

External links
 CBC TV video clip
 Results by party (total votes and seats won)
 Results for all ridings

References

Quebec general election
Elections in Quebec
General election
Quebec general election